Angh is a 2021 Naga short film directed, written and co-produced by Theja Rio. The film stars Amo Rio, Shekato Chishi and Johan Solo.

Synopsis
In the extremely rural parts of the North East of India, a village chief (a former headhunter) and his son remain the last people in the region to be converted into Christianity. Abandoned and living in isolation, they try their best to resist the social pressures of the new world.

Cast
 Amo Rio as Angh
 Shekato Chishi as Pastor
 Johan Solo as Amao

Production

Casting
All the actors had no experience in acting prior to filming of the film. The rehearsal of the script took 3 months.

Filming
The film was shot in April 2019 on a Kodak Super 16mm which is rarely used in modern filmmaking.

Awards and nominations

References

External links
 

Naga films
Films set in Nagaland
Films shot in Nagaland